John Simonian (15 December 1935 – 23 December 2019) was a Kenyan field hockey player. He competed at the 1960, 1964 and the 1968 Summer Olympics.

References

External links
 

1935 births
2019 deaths
Kenyan male field hockey players
Olympic field hockey players of Kenya
Field hockey players at the 1960 Summer Olympics
Field hockey players at the 1964 Summer Olympics
Field hockey players at the 1968 Summer Olympics